Cydninae is a subfamily of burrowing bugs in the family Cydnidae. There are about 11 genera and at least 40 described species in Cydninae.

Tribes and Genera
BioLib includes 2 tribes in the subfamily Cydninae:

Cydnini
Auth. Billberg, 1820
 Blaena Walker, 1868
 Blaenocoris J.A. Lis, 1997
 Centrostephus Horváth, 1919
 Chilocoris Mayr, 1865 i c g b
 Cydnotomus Lis, 2000
 Cydnus Fabricius, 1803 i c g b
 More genera ...
Data sources: i = ITIS, c = Catalogue of Life, g = GBIF, b = Bugguide.net

Geotomini
Auth. Wagner, 1963

 Adrisa Amyot & Audinet-Serville, 1843
 Aethoscytus Lis, 1994
 Aethus Dallas, 1851
 Afraethus Linnavuori, 1977
 Afroscytus Lis, 1997
 Alonipes Signoret, 1881
 Byrsinocoris Montandon, 1900
 Byrsinus Fieber, 1860
 Choerocydnus White, 1841
 Coleocydnus Lis, 1994
 Cydnochoerus Lis, 1996
 Cyrtomenus Amyot & Audinet-Serville, 1843
 Dallasiellus Berg, 1901
 Dearcla Signoret, 1883
 Ectinopus Dallas, 1851
 Endotylus Horváth, 1919
 Eulonips Lis, 1996
 Fromundiellus Lis, 1994
 Fromundus Distant, 1901
 Gampsotes Signoret, 1881
 Geocnethus Horváth, 1919
 Geopeltus Lis, 1990
 Geotomus Mulsant & Rey, 1866
 Hemixesta Bergroth, 1911
 Hiverus Amyot & Serville, 1843
 Katakadia Distant, 1899
 Lactistes Schiödte, 1848
 Macroscytus Fieber, 1860
 Megacydnus Linnavuori, 1993
 Melanaethus Uhler, 1876
 Mesocricus Horváth, 1884
 Microporus Uhler, 1872 i g b
 Microscytus Lis, 1993
 Onalips Signoret, 1881
 Pangaeus Stål, 1862 i c g b
 Paraethus Lis, 1994
 Peltoscytus Lis, 1993
 Peribyssus Puton, 1888
 Plonisa Signoret, 1881
 Prokne Linnavuori, 1993
 Prolactistes Lis, 2001
 Prolobodes Amyot & Serville, 1843
 Pseudonalips Froeschner, 1960
 Pseudoscoparipes Lis, 1990
 Raunoloma Lis, 1999
 Rhytidoporus Uhler, 1877
 Scoparipes Signoret, 1879
 Scoparipoides Lis, 1990
 Shansia Esaki & Ishihara, 1951
 Shillukia Linnavuori, 1977
 Teabooma Distant, 1914
 Tominotus Mulsant & Rey, 1866

References

Further reading

External links

 

Cydnidae